Polymitia eximipalpella is a moth. It belongs to the family Gracillariidae. It is known from Cyprus, Turkey, Israel, Jordan, Afghanistan, Iran, Iraq, Saudi Arabia, Syria, Tajikistan, Turkmenistan and Uzbekistan.

References

Gracillariinae
Insects of Turkey
Moths described in 1930